Mauricio Eduardo Jürgensen Roldán (born 19 December 1974) is a Chilean journalist, pundit, and musician.

From 2018 to 2019, he worked as a panelist in the morning show Bienvenidos on Canal 13. Similarly, in that channel he participated as a commentator at the Viña del Mar International Song Festival or also led with Francisca García Huidobro and Maly Jorqueira the late-night talk show «Sigamos de Largo».

References

External links
 

1974 births
Chilean people
University of Playa Ancha alumni
21st-century Chilean politicians
Living people
Chilean television personalities